There were seven squash events at the 2010 South American Games. The events were held over March 20–25.

Medal table

Medalists

Squash
2010
South American Games